The whitetip moray (Gymnothorax intesi) is a moray eel found in the western Pacific Ocean, around New Caledonia. It was first named by Fourmanoir and Rivaton in 1979.

References

intesi
Taxa named by Pierre Fourmanoir
Taxa named by Jacques Rivaton
Fish described in 1979